Kostryzhivka is an urban-type settlement in Chernivtsi Raion (district) of Chernivtsi Oblast (province) in western Ukraine. It hosts the administration of Kostryzhivka settlement hromada, one of the hromadas of Ukraine. At the 2001 census, population was 2,885. Current population: 

Until 18 July 2020, Kostryzhivka belonged to Zastavna Raion. The raion was abolished in July 2020 as part of the administrative reform of Ukraine, which reduced the number of raions of Chernivtsi Oblast to three. The area of Zastavna Raion was merged into Chernivtsi Raion.

Kostryzhivka is located on the right-bank of the Dniester River, across from the neighboring city of Zalishchyky in Ternopil Oblast.

References

Urban-type settlements in Chernivtsi Raion
Bukovina